"Tear You Down" is a 2008 song by sibling production duo the Brookes Brothers. "Tear You Down" was first released as a double A-side single with the track "Drifter", which was co-produced by drum and bass musician and Viper Recordings artist Dominic Furlonge. The single charted at #56 on the UK Singles Chart and spent 2 weeks at no. 1 in the UK Dance Chart; it is one of the artists' most commercially successful singles to date.

"Tear You Down" features a vocal sample from the chorus of the song "If I Were Your Woman" by Gladys Knight & the Pips. The track was later featured in the Brookes Brothers' self-titled debut album in 2011.

Chart performance

References

2008 songs
2008 singles
Brookes Brothers songs